Vikerhavn is a small fishing harbour and village on the southern part of the island Asmaløy in the Hvaler municipality of Viken county, Norway.

Villages in Østfold